The mountains of the Massif des Écrins (Écrins Massif) form the core of Écrins National Park in Hautes-Alpes and Isère in the French Alps.

Mountains
Barre des Écrins 4,102 m
La Meije 3,983 m
Ailefroide 3,954 m
Mont Pelvoux 3,946 m
Pic Sans Nom 3,913 m
Pic Gaspard 3,883 m
Le Râteau 3,809 m
Pic Coolidge 3,774 m
La Grande Ruine 3,765 m
Roche Faurio 3,730 m
Les Bans 3,669 m
Les Agneaux 3,663 m
Pic de la Grave 3,628 m
Pic de Neige Cordier 3,614 m
Aiguille du Plat de la Selle 3,597 m
Les Rouies 3,589 m
Olan 3,564 m
La Plaret 3,564 m
Tête de l'Etret 3,559 m
Tête de Gandoliere 3,544 m
L'Encoula 3,533 m
Pointe des Arcas 3,478 m
Roche de la Muzelle 3,465 m
Pointe Guyard 3,460 m
Tête des Fétoules 3,459 m
Le Sirac 3,440 m
Tête du Rouget 3,435 m
Pic de Says 3,421 m
Grande Aiguille de la Bérarde 3,419 m
Aiguille des Arias 3,403 m
Pointe de l'Aiglière 3,308 m
Pointe Swan 3,294 m
Le Jandri 3,288 m
Tetes des Soulaures 3,242 m
Pointe de Rougnoux 3,179 m
Vieux Chaillol 3,163 m
Têtes des Vautisse 3,156 m
Pic Combeynot 3,155 m
Aiguille Dibona 3,130 m
Pic des Souffles 3,098 m
Tête de Dormillouse 3,084 m
Pointe des Estaris 3,080 m
Le Rochail 3,023 m
Aiguille de Cedera 2,883 m
Grun de Saint Maurice 2,776 m

Glaciers
Glacier Blanc
Glacier Noir

References

External links
 Massif des Écrins 
 GR54 Hike in the Écrins 

Landforms of Isère
Mountain ranges of Auvergne-Rhône-Alpes
Mountain ranges of the Alps
Mountains of Hautes-Alpes
Mountain ranges of Provence-Alpes-Côte d'Azur
Auvergne-Rhône-Alpes region articles needing translation from French Wikipedia